The following is a list of people from Struga, North Macedonia.

 Mustafa Baruti, signatory of the Albanian Declaration of Independence
 Daniel Kajmakoski, singer
 Pajtim Kasami, footballer
 Vangel Kodžoman, painter
 Risto Krle, writer
 Nijaz Lena, footballer
 Mirdi Limani, kickboxer
 Lazo Lipovski, football goalkeeper
 Venera Lumani, singer
 Vlado Malevski, author of the Denes nad Makedonija
 Hristo Matov, revolutionary
 Dimitar Miladinov, writer, poet and folklorist
 Konstantin Miladinov, writer, poet and folklorist
 Nikola Moushmov, historian and numismatist
 Artim Šakiri, international footballer
 Ardit Shaqiri, footballer  
 Nuri Sojliu, signatory of the Albanian Declaration of Independence
 Myrteza Ali Struga, signatory of the Albanian Declaration of Independence
 Veliče Šumulikoski, footballer
 Flamur Tairi, footballer
 Ibrahim Temo, politician
 Veselin Vuković, handball player

People from Struga's surroundings

 Isnik Alimi, footballer from Delogoždi
 Voydan Chernodrinski, playwright from Selci
 Cincar Marko Kostić, warrior and diplomat in the First Serbian Uprising from Dolna Belica
 Andjelko Krstić, writer and playwright from Labuništa
 Artim Položani, footballer from Bidževo
 Nikola Šećeroski, politician and candidate for the Serbian presidency from Radožda
 Ilija Šumenković, minister and ambassador from 
 Krste Velkovski, footballer from Vevčani

Struga